Jacky Belabde (born July 11, 1960, in Champdeniers-Saint-Denis, France) is a retired Algerian professional footballer.

He played one match for the Algeria national football team, a friendly against Congolese football club Inter Club Brazzaville in Annaba, scoring two goals.

References

External links
Jacky Belabde profile at chamoisfc79.fr

1960 births
French sportspeople of Algerian descent
Living people
Algerian footballers
French footballers
Algeria international footballers
Association football forwards
Chamois Niortais F.C. players
Ligue 1 players
Ligue 2 players
Sportspeople from Deux-Sèvres
Footballers from Nouvelle-Aquitaine